Caloptilia quadripunctata is a moth of the family Gracillariidae. It is known from Beijing, China.

References

quadripunctata
Moths of Asia
Moths described in 1990